"Pososi" (stylized in all caps) is a song by Russian rapper Morgenshtern released by Zhara Music on June 5, 2020. A Russian hip hop song, it was written by Morgenshtern and its producer Slava Marlow. A music video directed by Frame Tamer came out at the same time as the single and was shot in one take.

Background

Beginning of June 2020, Morgenshtern revealed that he would release its new song on June 5. His fans thought he was going to release a song called "".

Pososi mostly received negative reviews as well as started gaining dislikes on YouTube. June 8, Morgenstern stated on Instagram that if the single would beat the record holder for dislikes in Russia, Timati and Guf's music video for the song "Moscow," he would release "Cadillac". Same day, the goal was achieved.

Cover
The artwork was a parody version on American rapper DaBaby's debut studio album, Baby on Baby.

References

2020 songs
2020 singles
Russian pop songs
Morgenshtern songs